Douglas A. Wiens is an American geophysicist, focusing in seismology and geophysics, currently the Robert S. Brookings Distinguished Professor at Washington University in St. Louis.

Career 
Wiens received his bachelor's degree in physics from Wheaton College in 1980, followed by an M.A. in 1982 and a Ph.D. in geosciences from Northwestern University in 1985 under the supervision of Seth Stein. He became a faculty member at Washington University in 1984, and has held visiting positions at Australian National University, the Carnegie Institution of Washington, and the University of Tokyo. He is a fellow of the American Geophysical Union.

References

Year of birth missing (living people)
Living people
Washington University in St. Louis faculty
American geophysicists
Northwestern University alumni
Scientists from Missouri
Physicists from Missouri